The HK-5000G is a carrier-based unmanned combat aerial vehicle developed by China Shipbuilding Industry Corporation for reconnaissance and precision strike missions. It features folding wings, uses catapult assisted takeoff, has an endurance of 12 hours and weighs about 5 metric tons.

See also

References

Unmanned military aircraft of China
Cloud Shadow
Single-engined jet aircraft
Proposed aircraft of China